The Supplemental Appropriations Act, 2008, which was signed into law on June 30, 2008,  is an Act of Congress that appropriated $250 billion for ongoing military operations and domestic programs. This law is an example of an Appropriation bill, a bill that grants the government permission to spend a certain amount of money.

Overview

The law includes funding for:

 $162 billion for military operations in Iraq and Afghanistan into 2009.
 $63 billion over 10 years for improved veterans' education benefits, called the Post-9/11 Veterans Educational Assistance Act of 2008.
 $12.5 billion over two years for an additional 13 weeks of unemployment benefits.
 $2.7 billion to replenish disaster aid and relief funds after the June 2008 Midwest floods.
 Blocks of six new Medicaid rules that would have cut state funding by $10 billion over the next five years.
 $10.1 billion in other spending.

References

United States federal defense and national security legislation
Acts of the 110th United States Congress
United States federal appropriations legislation